Sarny may refer to:

Sarny, a town in Ukraine
Sarny, Łódź Voivodeship, central Poland
Sarny, Lublin Voivodeship, east Poland
Sarny, Lower Silesian Voivodeship, south-western Poland
Sarny (novel) - a novel by Gary Paulsen